The 2000 United States presidential election in Nevada took place on November 7, 2000, and was part of the 2000 United States presidential election. Voters chose four representatives, or electors to the Electoral College, who voted for president and vice president.

Nevada was won by Texas Governor George W. Bush, who won the state with 49.52% of the vote over Al Gore, who took 45.98%. Bush won every county except Clark County, which is home of Las Vegas. Bush also won Nevada's 2nd congressional district, as Gore won Nevada's 1st congressional district. Also, Ralph Nader got over 2% of the vote. This was also the most recent presidential election (while also being the only time since 1976, and the second time since 1908), when Nevada did not side with the winner of the popular vote. Nevada was one of many states decided by close margins; had Gore won the Silver State's 4 electoral votes, the election would have gone his way.

Nevada weighed in as 2% more Republican than the national average; in the previous election, it was 4% more Republican. The state was returned to the Republican column regardless. This is the only time New Mexico and Nevada have ever voted for different candidates since New Mexico's first election in 1912.

Nevada was one of nine states won by Bush that had supported Clinton twice.

Results

By county

Counties that flipped from Democratic to Republican
Mineral (Largest city: Hawthorne)

By congressional district
Bush and Gore both won a congressional district.

Electors

Technically the voters of Nevada cast their ballots for electors: representatives to the Electoral College. Nevada is allocated 4 electors because it has two congressional districts and two senators. All candidates who appear on the ballot or qualify to receive write-in votes must submit a list of four electors, who pledge to vote for their candidate and his or her running mate. Whoever wins the majority of votes in the state is awarded all four electoral votes. Their chosen electors then vote for president and vice president. Although electors are pledged to their candidate and running mate, they are not obligated to vote for them. An elector who votes for someone other than his or her candidate is known as a faithless elector.

The electors of each state and the District of Columbia met on December 18, 2000 to cast their votes for president and vice president. The Electoral College itself never meets as one body. Instead the electors from each state and the District of Columbia met in their respective capitols.

The following were the members of the Electoral College from the state. All were pledged to and voted for George W. Bush and Dick Cheney:
Jane Ham
Trudy Hushbeck
William Raggio
Tom Wiesner

See also
United States presidential elections in Nevada

References

Nevada
2000
2000 Nevada elections